is a train station on the West Japan Railway Company Sakurajima Line (JR Yumesaki Line) in Konohana-ku, Osaka, Osaka Prefecture, Japan. It is the terminus of the line. The station lies at the southwest edge of Universal Studios Japan (and once existed where the park now stands, before the line was rerouted); however, the park can only be accessed from Universal City Station, the next station on the line.

Layout
The station has an island platform serving two tracks.

History 
Station numbering was introduced in March 2018 with Sakurajima being assigned station number JR-P17.

References 

Konohana-ku, Osaka
Railway stations in Osaka
Railway stations in Japan opened in 1910
Stations of West Japan Railway Company